Scopula vigilata is a moth of the  family Geometridae. It is found on Malta, Sicily, Crete and Cyprus and in Italy, Greece and the Near East.

Subspecies
Scopula vigilata vigilata
Scopula vigilata turatii (Wagner, 1926)

References

Moths described in 1913
vigilata
Moths of Europe
Moths of Asia